The 20th arrondissement of Paris (known in French as the XXe arrondissement de Paris or simply as "le vingtième") is the last of the consecutively numbered arrondissements of the capital city of France. Also known as Ménilmontant after the Ménilmontant neighbourhood it encompasses in its northwest, it is on the right bank of the River Seine and contains some of the city's most cosmopolitan districts. It covers four quarters: Belleville, Saint-Fargeau, Père-Lachaise and Charonne. In 2019, it had a population of 194,994.

The 20th arrondissement is internationally best known for its Père Lachaise Cemetery, the world's most-visited cemetery where one can find the tombs of a number of famous artists.

Geography
The land area of this arrondissement is 5.984 km2 (2.31 sq. miles, or 1,479 acres).

Demographics
The population of Paris's 20th arrondissement peaked in 1936, when it had 208,115 inhabitants. Today it remains very dense in population and business activity with 197,067 inhabitants in 2009 and 54,786 jobs as of the last census in 1999.

Historical population

Immigration

Cityscape

Places of interest
 Parc de Belleville
 Père Lachaise CemeteryContaining the tombs of many famous artists: composers (such as Frédéric Chopin and Gioacchino Rossini), writers (including Oscar Wilde, Honoré de Balzac, and Marcel Proust), painters (Camille Pissarro, Jacques-Louis David, Eugène Delacroix, and others), musicians (Jim Morrison of The Doors and Edith Piaf among others), and the playwright Molière.
 Church of Saint-Jean-Bosco, Paris. One of the few Art Deco churches in Paris, built 1933-1938. It retains its original Art Deco decoration.

Important districts

 Quarter of Belleville
 Neighbourhood of Ménilmontant
 Quarter of Charonne

Government and infrastructure
The Directorate-General for External Security (DGSE) has its head office in the arrondissement.

Media
The humour publication Charlie Hebdo had its head office in the arrondissement.

Education

Senior high schools include:
 Lycée Hélène Boucher
 
 Lycée Charles-de-Gaulle
 Lycée Beth Yacov
 Lycée Heikhal Menahem Sinaï

Other institutions:

References

External links

 Joining the Locals In Paris’s East – slideshow by The New York Times